Marco Dalla Costa (born 25 March 1988) is an Italian professional footballer who plays as a forward for Pinerolo.

Club career

Youth career
Born in Pinerolo, the Province of Turin (Torino), Dalla Costa was signed by F.C. Internazionale Milano in mid-2003. In 2005–06 season he was the member of Berretti under-18 team (B team of age under-20). He scored 7 goals in regular season.

Lega Pro clubs
In mid-2006 he was loaned to Pro Sesto along with Nicola Redomi, Daniele Federici, Alessandro Brioschi, Alessio Colombo, Alessandro Mosca and Luca Palazzo (co-ownership), all born in 1988, as Inter no longer operated its Berretti U-19 team as a feeder team of Primavera, and they failed to compete into that main team.

Dalla Costa made his first team debut during the season. In January 2007 Inter sold half of the registration rights to Pro Sesto for a fee of €500 (Federici also sold for €500), and Pro Sesto striker Aiman Napoli joined Inter in exchange for €70,000. In 2007–08 Serie C1 he played 15 times. Dalla Costa then spent 2008–09 season at Seconda Divisione (ex- Serie C2) side Sangiovannese, which he mainly as a substitute.

The co-ownership was renewed in June 2007, 2008 and again in 2009. Pro Sesto sold its 50% rights to fellow Seconda Divisione club Olbia in mid-2009 (Pro Sesto relegated in 2009) However, he returned to Sesto San Giovanni in January 2010. In 2009–10 he only played 10 times in total. In June 2010, Inter gave up the remain 50% rights to Olbia. However, the Commissione di Vigilanza sulle Società di Calcio Professionistiche (Co.Vi.So.C.) of FIGC rejected to issue new license for Olbia at the end of season, thus folded.

Serie D
Dalla Costa then moved to Serie D (non-professional/regional) team Caratese in 2010–11 season.

Novara
In March 2011 he signed a pre-contract with Serie B team Novara Calcio to join the club at the end of season. The Serie D club located in Lombardy also became the satellite club of Piedmontese club Novara in July 2011. Novara promoted in June and in August 2011 he was loaned to Seconda Divisione team Pro Patria. On 31 January 2012 he was exchanged with Riccardo Capogna.

Serie D champion
On 15 June 2012 he was signed by Serie D newcomer Bra. The team was from home region of Dalla Costa, in the Province of Cuneo, Piedmont. The team promoted as the group A winner.

International career
Dalla Costa had played for Italy youth team at 2005 FIFA U-17 World Championship (2 matches) and 2005 UEFA European Under-17 Football Championship (3 matches).

Honours
Bra
 Serie D: 2013

References

External links
 LaSerieD.com Profile 
 Football.it Profile 
 FIGC 
 
 

Italian footballers
Inter Milan players
S.S.D. Pro Sesto players
A.S.D. Sangiovannese 1927 players
Olbia Calcio 1905 players
Association football forwards
Italy youth international footballers
People from the Province of Turin
1988 births
Living people
A.C. Bra players
Pinerolo F.C. players
Footballers from Piedmont